Xakao is a village in North-West District of Botswana. It is located close to the Namibian border, where the river Okavango enters Botswana. The population was 1,049 in 2001 census.

References

North-West District (Botswana)
Villages in Botswana